1990 Soviet Second League, Zone West was part of the  season of association football competition of the Soviet Second League. The Zone West of the Second League was established as part of reorganization of the whole Second League when it was split into upper Second League (with three zones) and lower Second League (with ten zones). The competition was won by Bukovina Chernovtsy. 

The games in the group started on April 7, 1990 with 8 match ups and finished on November 8, 1990 with final 11 matches.

Teams
The Second League was restructured reducing number of zones from 9 to 3.

Admitted teams
 1989 Zone 6 - top nine teams (Volyn Lutsk, Bukovina Chernovtsy, Niva Ternopol, Zaria Lugansk, Niva Vinnitsa, Kremen Kremenchug, SKA Odessa, Vorskla Poltava, Zakarpatie Uzhgorod)
 1989 Zone 5 - six teams (Karpaty Lvov, Baltika Kaliningrad, Dinamo Brest, Dnepr Mogilev, Khimir Grodno, Zaria Beltsy)
 1989 Zone 3 - three teams (Lori Kirovokan, Spartak Nalchik, Shirak Leninakan)
 1989 Zone 2 - a team (Start Ulyanovsk)
 1989 Zone 1 - a team (Iskra Smolensk)

Promoted teams
None

Relegated teams
 FC Daugava Riga, 1944
 FC Galichina Drogobich

Renamed teams 
Prior to the start of the season SKA-Karpaty Lvov was renamed to Galichina and moved to city of Drogobich (Drohobych).

Final standings

Representation by Republic

 : 11
  4
 : 3
  2
 : 1
  1

Top goalscorers
The following were the top ten goalscorers.

External links
 Second League at rsssf.com
 1990 Second League, West at the Luhansk football portal
 Second League (West) at wildstat.ru
 Second League (West) at footballfacts.ru

Soviet Second League seasons
2 League West Zone
2 League West Zone
2 League West Zone
2 League West Zone
2 League West Zone
1990 in the Moldavian Soviet Socialist Republic
1989–90 in Moldovan football
1990–91 in Moldovan football